Vladimir Sakhnenko (Russian: Влади́мир Сахне́нко, born January 10, 1930, in the Sumy region of Ukraine – July 31, 2008, Tula) was a painter and ceramist, and a member of the Union of Artists of the USSR since 1967. He is the father of artist Ivan Sakhnenko.

He finished the art school in Voroshilovograd in 1951 and then studied at the Surikov Academic Institute in Moscow, where he met Ilya Kabakov and his future wife – sculptress Zoya Riabchenko. He took part in art exhibitions since 1957. He lived and worked in Tula.

Ceramics 
Vladimir Sakhnenko created monumental objects, exterior ceramics and pottery houseware. Utility and decorativeness of his works served to conceal seditious for the Soviet period experiments with design and form, which he continued in painting.

Many of his works still adorn cultural centres, Tula Drama Theatre, Intourist hotel in Yalta and the government dacha in Foros. State Museum of Culture History of Uzbekistan in Samarkand and World Trade Centre in Moscow are also the holders of Vladimir Sakhnenko's ceramics.

Almost to the end of his life he worked daily in his workroom at Kislotoupor Shchyokino factory making crocks, vases, amphorae, flowerpots, multiple ceramic constructions, ceramic sculptures of various creatures, etc.

He used chamotte, mostly with glaze. In the late 1970s he discovered temperature-resistant composition of blue-green glaze that can survive any extreme weather conditions, including frost. Sakhnenko's glazed ceramics has been held out of doors in Samarkand and Crimea for almost 40 years.

Painting 
In the 1970s the artist created 13 large black and white canvases (held in Erarta Museum). In the early 1980s, Vladimir Sakhnenko turned to making bright paintings: portraits, still lives and works that depict biblical scenes. His personal style (both in painting and pottery) features easy switch from figurativeness to abstraction and ornamentality.

Art collections 
 Erarta Museum of Contemporary Art, Saint Petersburg
 Art Season Gallery and Art Caravan Gallery, Moscow
 State Museum of Culture History of Uzbekistan, Samarkand
 Tula Museum of Fine Arts

Recent exhibitions 
 1999 — On the Staraya Basmannaya Street Gallery, Moscow, featuring his son Ivan Sakhnenko
 2005 — Autumn Marathon, Central House of Artists, Moscow, featuring Ivan Sakhnenko, Avetik and others
 2006 — Revelation of Colour, Central House of Artists, Moscow, solo exhibition, Art Caravan Gallery
 2007 — Abstract Art. The Early 21st Century, Central House of Artists, Moscow

Selected works

Ceramics

Painting

References 

1930 births
2008 deaths
20th-century Russian painters
Russian male painters
21st-century Russian painters
Russian ceramists
20th-century ceramists
21st-century ceramists
20th-century Russian male artists
21st-century Russian male artists
People from Sumy Oblast